Páll Guðmundsson (born 1959 in Húsafell in the west of Iceland, where he still lives) is a sculptor and artist.

He has done part of his studies at the University of Fine Arts in Cologne, Germany.

Mostly, he sculptures faces of people out of the rock he finds around Húsafell. He has for example sculptured the faces of Johann Sebastian Bach, Björk and the Icelandic writer Thor Vilhjálmsson.

Páll is also working as a musician with a unique idiophone, a large xylophone-like instrument made of stones called the Steinharpa. He crafted the instrument himself using stones found around his home.  With the instrument he has performed along with the Icelandic band Sigur Rós.

References

External links
http://pallg.is/

1959 births
Living people
Icelandic sculptors